Bénifontaine is a commune in the Pas-de-Calais department in the Hauts-de-France region in northern France.

Geography
The airport of Lens-Bénifontaine (code LFQL) is located in the commune.

History
The commune owes its name to the quality of the local water, which is used for brewing the regional Ch'Ti beer.
During World War I, the village, along with many others, was completely destroyed.

Population

Sights
 The Castelain Ch’ti brewery.
 The aerodrome.

See also
Communes of the Pas-de-Calais department

References

External links

 Website of the Communaupole de Lens-Liévin 
 Aéroclub de Lens 
 Castelain Brewery website 

Communes of Pas-de-Calais
Artois